Colt is the debut studio album by Irish musician Hilary Woods. It was released on June 8, 2018 under Sacred Bones Records.

Critical reception
Colt was met with "generally favorable" reviews from critics. At Metacritic, which assigns a weighted average rating out of 100 to reviews from mainstream publications, this release received an average score of 71, based on 9 reviews. Aggregator Album of the Year gave the release a 67 out of 100 based on a critical consensus of 7 reviews.

Accolades

Track listing

References

2018 debut albums
Sacred Bones Records albums